Chitrananda Abeysekera (1930–1992) was a veteran broadcaster, poet, writer and an administrator. He joined Sri Lanka Broadcasting Corporation, then Radio Ceylon as a radio announcer and retired as the Director of Sinhala Services in 1989. He was also the President of Aganuwara Tharuna Kavi Samajaya (Athakasa) for more than a decade and initiated a lot of programs that benefited poets and the public alike. He restarted Kavi Suwanda, the poetry newspaper for poets. Chitrananda dedicated his whole life to Sinhala poetry and literature, not forgetting Radio Journalism.

Early life 

Agampodi Harindranath Chitrananda Mendis Abeysekera was born on 7 March 1930 in Kosgoda. He was the only child of Mr. Agampodi Louis Mendis Abeysekera and Mrs. Degiri Roslin Henry de Zoysa. He started his primary education at Kosgoda Sinhala School in Galle district but when he was nine, Chitrananda entered Nalanda College Colombo. He was a prominent member of the College Debating Team and also of the College Culture Club. He published his first book of poetry (Sarasavi Gitaya) as a student at Nalanda with the help of mentor and teacher U. A. S. Perera. Young Chitrananda was a corporal of Nalanda College Colombo Senior Cadet Corps.

Chitrananda began work as an English assistant teacher in a village school in the rural town of Menikkadavara in the Dedigama electorate in 1949. He left this post soon after to lend his hand to the Registrar General's department, Official Languages Commission and the Official Languages Bureau.

As a radio journalist 

On 6 August 1956 he found his long journey at Radio Ceylon as a guest producer of poetry, drama and features. He would subsequently advance to the top position of Director of Sinhala Services which he would hold till his retirement till 1989. In his position, Abeysekera would attempt to advance new talent through programs like 'Nava Mihira'. During this period, he served as the head of the Rural Services and Publication divisions. Chitrananda headed the "Govi Jaya Handa" program project during Hon. Dudley Senanayake era and was very popular among rural Ceylon. He was a very talented and well-known broadcaster and administrator. He was also very popular as a Live Radio commentator.

He got the opportunity to train on different mass media fields at ABC – Australia, BBC, AIBD – Malaysia, Pakistan and in 1980 he represented Sri Lanka at Non-aligned Broadcasters Conference in Freetown, Sierra Leone. He participated in several Poetry and Cultural events in Yugoslavia and China.

Photo gallery

As a poet, writer, lyricist 

Chitrananda became the President of Young Poets' Association of Colombo (ATHAKASA) in 1979 and held this position till his death.
In addition to his initial school publication, Sarasavi Gitaya, Abeysekera published several other poetry collections and story books:

Poetry and Story Books

Suli Sulang – Poetry, 1961Publisher: M.D. Gunasena & Co. Colombo, Sri Lanka
Sakwala Dunna – PoetryPublisher: M.D. Gunasena & Co. Colombo, Sri Lanka
Suduta Lilu Kavi – Poetry, 1974Publisher:Samayawardana Printers, Maligakanda Rd, Maradana, Sri Lanka
Awatharaya – Short StroryPublisher: M.D. Gunasena & Co. Colombo, Sri Lanka
Satan Bima Kandulu – Short StoryPublisher: M.D. Gunasena & Co. Colombo, Sri Lanka
Savi Nethi Ath – NovelPublisher: M.D. Gunasena & Co. Colombo, Sri Lanka
Jaya Siri Maha Bodhi – Songs, 1982 – Collection of Popular Songs written by ChitranandaPublisher:Lassana Printers, Wellampitiya, Sri Lanka
Kavya Manjari – Poetry, 1983Publisher:Samayawardana Printers, Maligakanda Rd, Maradana, Sri Lanka
Kavya Pushpanjali – Poetry, 1983 – Awarded The Best Poetry Book at The State Literary Awards Festival by The Ministry of Cultural AffairsPublisher:Samayawardana Printers, Maligakanda Rd, Maradana, Sri Lanka
Swarana Mali – Poetry, 1984Publisher:Captain Printers, Maradana 1st, Colombo 10, Sri Lanka
Ran Sannasa – Poetry, 1985Publisher:Dulmini Printers, "Kamkarupura" Flats, Colombo 14, Sri Lanka
Samanala Mahima – Poetry, 1986 – Awarded The Best Poetry Book at The State Literary Awards Festival by The Ministry of Cultural AffairsPublisher:Dulmini Printers, "Kamkarupura" Flats, Colombo 14, Sri Lanka
Sewana Ruwana – Poetry, 1987Publisher:Dulmini Printers, "Kamkarupura" Flats, Colombo 14, Sri Lanka
Susata Kala – Poetry, 1989 – Collection of Poems by Prominent PoetsPublisher:Dulmini Printers, "Kamkarupura" Flats, Colombo 14, Sri Lanka

Popular radio songs

Jayasiri Ma Bodhi: Singer – Dayaratne Ranatunge, Music – Rohitha Wijesuriya
Vilwala Mal Pokuru Pokuru: Singer – Neela Wickramasinghe & T.M. Jayaratne
Ma Ipaduna Mage Ratata Sewaya Karala: Singer – Edward Jayakody
Nidahasa Gena Kavi Liyanna: Singer – Edward Jayakody
Wediya Honda Narakai Me Loke: Singer – Mohideen Baig
Kiri Ithirewa Nawa Wasare: Singer – H.R. Jothipala
Alokaya Deka Yanna: Singer – Latha Walpola
Swarnamali Se Kirane: Singer – Amara Ranatunge
Ran Diya Bindu Mahaweli: Singer –
Oba Yana Maga Nathara Novi: Singer –
Ramya Bhumi Saru Bhumi: Singer –
Jathiye Udara Sithum: Singer – Edward Jayakodi
Oba Dan Keewath Kandulu Sala: Singer – Milton Mallawarachchi, Music – Sarath Dassanayake
Sinarella Sisi Kirane: Singer – Milton Mallawarachchi, Music – Sarath Dassanayake
Keewemi Oba Hata: Singer – H.R. Jothipala
Man Podikale Dekkata Passe – H.R. Jothipala

Movie Songs

Movie – Sirimali by Robin Thampoe in 1959Produced by P.L. Buddhadasa & Meena ThampoeMusic by V. Krishnamurthi (Indian national)
Song – Karunawe Yukath Dharma: Singer – Latha Walpola
Song – Aakase Aawase: Singer  – Latha and Dharmadasa Walpola
Song – Aay Wade Mey: Singer – Christy Leonard Perera and K. Rani
Song – Rani Karalini: Singer – Latha Walpola
Song – Pem Hada Moray: Singer – Latha Walpola
Song – Pun Chandra Paaya: Singer – Indrani Wijebandara and Sidney Attygalle
Song – Sinasewi Wando: Singer – Latha Walpola

Movie – Nalangana  by L.S. Ramachandran in 1960Produced by S. M. NayagamMusic by R. Muththusami
Song – Ho Surathal: Singer – Rukmani Devi
Song – Me Aawaa Mung Awaa: Singer – Rukmani Devi

Movie – Pirimiyek Nisa  by T. Somasekaran & K.A.W. Perera in 1960Produced by Premalal Edirisinghe (E.A.P. Edirisinghe)Music by R. Muththusami
Song – Agata Kadun: Singer – Latha Walpola
Song – Suwandathi Pipunu Kusum: Singer – Latha Walpola
Song – Dutu Da Wagema Lasanayi: Singer – Dharmadasa and Latha Walpola
Song – Meda Poti Athata Mitata: Singer – Mohideen Baig, Srimathi Rasodari and chorus

Movie – Suvineetha Lalini by Robin Thampoe in 1961Produced by Robin ThampoeMusic by R. Muththusami
Song – Pem Ganine: Singer – Angeline de Lanerolle (Gunatillake) and H. R. Jothipala
Song – Doy Doya Puthe: Singer – Latha Walpola
Song – Loku Podi Katath: Singer – Chandra de Silva and L. M. Perera
Song – Amme Badagini Wenawa: Singer – Angeline de Lanerolle, Indrani Wijebandara and chorus
Song – Maha Polowe Upan: Singer – Mohideen Baig
Song – Sapawath Pawuluk Paramarithe: Singer – Mohideen Baig
Song – Thani We Mey Loke: Singer – Latha Walpola
Song – Lipe Mule: Singer – Sidney Attygalle and Angeline de Lanerolle
Song – Nihaday Gamanaya: Singer – H. R. Jothipala, Angeline de Lanerolle and chorus
Song – Suhada Madura Preme: Singer – H. R. Jothipala and Angeline de Lanerolle

Movie – Mage Putha by Devendra Goyel in 1961Dubbing Direction by Thewis GurugeMusic by P.L.A. SomapalaOriginal Hindhi Movie:Chirag Kahan Roshni Kahan
Song – Assaya Gone Tik Tik Tik I: Singer – Latha Walpola & Geetha 
Song – Assaya Gone Tik Tik Tik II: Singer – Latha Walpola & Geetha   
Song – Nivi Nivi Dilihe Tharuwe I: Singer – Indrani Wijayabandara
Song – Nivi Nivi Dilihe Tharuwe II: Singer – Latha Walpola

Movie – Samiya Birindage Deviyaya by Robin Thampoe
Song – Kothanaka Sitiyath Oba Melowe: Singer – H.R. Jothipala 
Song – Lassana Rattharan Babo: Singer – Rukmani Devi
Song – Kiyanna Ran Kanda: Singer – Rukmani Devi
Song – Monawa Hithagena: Singer – Rukmani Devi
Song – Oba Dekumen Ma Sith: Singer – H.R. Jothipala

Movie – Sudo Suduby Robin Thampoe in 1965Music – Somadasa Elvitigala
Song – Savibala Yakada Wagei: Singer – W.D. Amaradewa
Song – Prema Sebawii: Singer – Latha & Dharmadasa Walpola
Song – Heenmenike Mage: Singer – W.D. Amaradewa

Movie – Saranaby Asoka PierisMusic – Mohamed Sali & P.L.A. SomapalaSingers – Sujatha Perera, Latha & Dharmadasa Walpola, Manel Upasena
Asoka Pieris has also written few songs for this movie

Movie – Sudu Sande Kalu Walaby Robin Thampoe in 1963
Song – Denna Eka Sirurey: Singer – H.R. Jothipala
Song – Maa Langa Hinehee: Singer – H.R. Jothipala
Song – Wanasanna Jeewe: Singer – H.R. Jothipala

Movie – Kolankarayo by Thissa Nagodawithana
Movie – Sigiri Kashyapaby Bindu Gunasekera in 1966Music – M.K. Rocksami
Song – Narapathiya Wetha Yanne: Singer – H.R. Jothipala
Song – Pape Galee Lowa: Singer – A.J. Kareem

Movie – SRI 296Premnath Morayas in 1959Produced by Premnath MorayasMusic by P.L.A. SomapalaOriginal Hindi Movie: C.I.D.
Song – Wediya Honda Narakaine: Singer – Mohideen Baig
Song – Man Awa Hirabath Kala: Singer – H.R. Jothipala
Song – Me Enna Sanasannam: Singer – Latha Walpola
Song – Doyya Gan Ma Kiri Ketiya: Singer – Indrani Wijayabandara
Song – Pami Loke Rengum: Singer – Indrani Wijayabandara & H.R. Jothipala
Song – Sasi Piye: Singer – G.S.B. Rani Perera
Song – Duk Gini Godaka: Singer – G.S.B. Rani Perera
Song – Ma Soya Aa Nisa: Singer – Indrani Wijayabandara

Movie – Suhada Divi Piduma in 1962
Movie – Sulalitha Sobani in 1964

Movie Related

Movie – Sepaliby W.M.S. Thampoe in 1958Produced by Robin ThampoeFilm Script: Chitrananda Abeysekera & Suriya Kumar
Story from the Hindi movie Dulari – 1949
Movie – Daruwa Kageda?by Herbi Seneviratne in 1961Produced by W.M.S. ThampoeScreen Play: Chitrananda Abeysekera
Story from the Hindi movie Dulari – 1949
Movie – Sirimali by Robin Thampoe in 1959Produced by P.L. Buddhadasa & Meena ThampoeDialogues: Chitrananda Abeysekera
Movie – Sudo Sudu by Robin Thampoe in 1965Dialogues & Screen Play: Chitrananda Abeysekera

Other Links
Features | Online edition of Daily News – Lakehouse Newspapers 
Latha Walpola – Nightingale of Sri Lanka | Asian Tribune 
English girl of Lankan parents for Karate World Cup 
Remembering Sri Lanka's Nightingale: 30th Death Anniversary of Rukmani Devi 
Nalanda Old Boys

References

Lyrics of the Sinhala Cinema from 1957 to 1961, by Prof. Sunil Ariyaratne – 
Library of Congress Onlone Catalog 
Open Library.org 
www.chitranandaabeysekera.org 
 Chitrananda Abeysekera 

1930 births
1992 deaths
Sri Lankan radio personalities
Sinhalese poets
Sri Lankan Buddhists
Alumni of Nalanda College, Colombo